Tough as Iron is a 2013 South Korean film written and directed by Ahn Gwon-tae, starring Yoo Ah-in in the title role.

Plot
Gang Cheol (whose name means "iron" in Korean) was once a legendary street gangster in Busan, but he put away his fists and cleaned up his act for the sake of his mother Soon-i, who has dementia. Things are going well for him; he now works as a stevedore at a loading dock and is pursuing a relationship with Soo-ji, a free-spirited woman from Seoul vacationing in the port city. But Soon-i is diagnosed with kidney failure and needs an expensive organ transplant that he cannot afford. Knowing that Cheol is desperate for money, local gang leader Sang-gon proposes that Cheol come work for him and his brother Hwi-gon. At first Cheol refuses, but when his debt-ridden best friend Jong-soo gives the deed to Cheol's house to Sang-gon as collateral for a private loan, he's left with no choice but to get dragged back into Busan's criminal underworld. Cheol is ordered to kill a visiting Japanese Yakuza boss whose death will enable Sang-gon's ascension within the Korean branch of the mob organization.

Cast
 Yoo Ah-in as Gang Cheol
 Kim Hae-sook as Kim Soon-i
 Kim Jung-tae as Sang-gon
 Kim Sung-oh as Hwi-gon
 Jung Yu-mi as Jo Soo-ji
 Lee Si-eon as Jong-soo
 Shin Jung-geun as Yagami
 Bae Seul-ki as Go Jae-sook
 Jang Tae-sung as Lee Byeong-hee
 Kim Byeong-seo as Poloti
 Kim Seo-kyeong as Chyurining
 Choi Young-sung as Adidas
 Song Young-chang as Hwan-gyu
 Kim Hyun-sook as Organ broker
 Go In-beom as Police substation captain
 Lee Jeong-heon as Director of internal medicine department

Release
Tough as Iron opened in South Korean theaters on October 2, 2013. It grossed  on 1,209,363 admissions.

It also received a limited theatrical release in the United States (October 11, 2013) and Japan (May 2014).

References

External links 
  
 Tough as Iron  at CJ Entertainment
 
 
 

2013 films
2010s Korean-language films
South Korean action drama films
Yakuza films
2010s Japanese films
2010s South Korean films